Ajmonia smaragdula is a species of spider of the genus Ajmonia. It is endemic to Sri Lanka.

See also 
 List of Dictynidae species

References

Spiders described in 1905
Dictynidae
Endemic fauna of Sri Lanka
Spiders of Asia